Standard Chartered South Africa, whose full name is Standard Chartered Bank South Africa, but often referred to as Stanchart South Africa, is a commercial bank in South Africa. A subsidiary of British Standard Chartered it is registered as a Foreign Bank, by the South African Reserve Bank.

The bank is a large financial services provider. , the bank's total assets were valued at ZAR:32,239,234,000. At that time, the shareholders' equity was ZAR:3,765,873,000.

Branch network
As at April 2016,the bank maintains networked branches at the following locations:

 Johannesburg Branch - 5th Floor, 4 Sandown Valley Crescent, Sandton
 Cape Town Branch - Cape Town
 Durban Branch - Durban

See also
 List of banks in South Africa

References

Banks of South Africa
Banks established in 1992
Companies based in Sandton
South African companies established in 1992